Ranunculus schmalhausenii is a species of flowering plant belonging to the family Ranunculaceae.

Its native range is Northern and Northeastern Europe.

Synonyms:
 Batrachium dichotomum (Schmalh.) Trautv.
 Batrachium nevense Tzvelev
 Ranunculus dichotomus (Schmalh.) N.I.Orlova
 Ranunculus nevensis (Tzvelev) Luferov

References

schmalhausenii